Ru Darya (also Romanized as Rū Daryā; also known as Rūd Daryā) is a village in Bakesh-e Yek Rural District, in the Central District of Mamasani County, Fars Province, Iran. At the 2006 census, its population was 134, in 30 families.

References 

Populated places in Mamasani County